Agonopterix flurii is a moth in the family Depressariidae. It was described by Sonderegger in 2013. It is found in the Alps in Switzerland.

The wingspan is 16.5–19 mm for males and 16–18 mm for females. Adults are on wing in August and September.

The larvae feed on Centaurea scabiosa.

References

Moths described in 2013
Agonopterix
Moths of Europe